The North River Stone Schoolhouse is a historic building located north of Winterset, Iowa, United States. Built in 1874 of coursed native limestone, the one-room schoolhouse educated local students until it closed in 1945. The building features quoining on the four corners of the exterior, four windows capped with stone lintels on the east and west elevations, and an off-center doorway on the main (south) facade. From 1962 to 1973 the building was restored, and it opened as a school museum operated by the Madison County Historical Society. The building was listed on the National Register of Historic Places in 1977.

References

School buildings completed in 1874
One-room schoolhouses in Iowa
Vernacular architecture in Iowa
Museums in Madison County, Iowa
National Register of Historic Places in Madison County, Iowa
School buildings on the National Register of Historic Places in Iowa